South Korean indie rock band Jannabi have headlined three concert tours, fifteen concerts, numerous festivals and other live performances. They are considered one of the most prolific live acts from South Korea, labeled "first in festival recruitment" and "performance powerhouse" with unwavering ticket power by South Korean media.

Together

Together was the first concert tour by Jannabi, in support of their second studio album Legend (2019). The tour visited five cities in South Korea: Seoul, Cheongju, Daegu and Jeonju. Tickets to the show were sold out after opening to the public on February 15.

Concert Dates

Nonsense II

Nonsense II was the second concert tour by Jannabi. The tour began on February 15, 2020, with two dates in Seoul and finished on February 22 in Gwangju. The 20,000 tickets to the nationwide concert were sold out. Peponi Music later announced that Daegu, Busan and Chuncheon concerts will be cancelled due to the COVID-19 pandemic.

Concert Dates

Fantastic Old-fashioned End of the Year Party!

Fantastic Old-fashioned End of the Year Party! is the ongoing third concert tour by Jannabi. It is their first solo concert in about three years since the Nonsense II concert held in February 2020. The tour will visit eight cities in South Korea, starting on November 5, 2022.

Background  
On September 29, 2022, Peponi Music announced that Jannabi would tour concert halls in eight cities in South Korea: Busan, Gwangju, Seoul, Incheon, Daegu, Suwon, Chuncheon and Cheonan. The first ticket opening was in Busan and Seoul and put on sale on Ticketlink on October 4, 2022. The two-day concert in Busan sold out all seats in three minutes while the Seoul performances had 160,000 visitors as the reservation started, causing strain on the server at one time. It ranked first and second in the daily reservation rate ranking and weekly best ranking, respectively. Due to high demand, additional limited-view seat tickets for Seoul and Daegu performances were made available for purchase.

Set list

Concert Dates

Concerts

Festivals

 2014 Incheon Pentaport Rock Festival – Moonlight Stage (Penta Super Rookie) (August 3, Songdo Moonlight Festival Park, Incheon)
 2014 SBS Inkigayo Super Concert (April 28, Gwangju World Cup Stadium)
 2014 New Year World Rock Festival with Naver 'Musician League' (Winner) (December 19, AX-KOREA)
 2015 Naver 'Musician League' X Green Plugged Seoul 'Rookie Green Friends' Competition (April 20, Lotte Card Art Center Art Hall) 
 2015 Shinhan Card Great Rookie Project (May 16, MUV Concert Hall, Hongdae) 
 2015 Green Plugged Seoul Festival (Rookie of the Year) (May 23, Nanji Hangang Park) 
 2015 Paradise of Jannabi (June 21, Lotte Department Store – Cheongnyangni Branch) 
 2015 Gwangju Summer Universiade Youth Festival (July 8, Asian Culture Complex & Geumnam Park Stage)
 2015 Incheon Pentaport Rock Festival – Dream Stage (August 8, Songdo Moonlight Festival Park)
 2015 Let's Rock Festival – Peace Stage (September 20, Nanji Hangang Park)
 2016 Shinhan Card Great Rookie Project (May 7, KT&G Sangsang Madang, Seoul) 
 2016 Incheon Pentaport Rock Festival – Dream Stage (August 14, Songdo Moonlight Festival Park)
 2016 Let's Rock Festival – Peace Stage (September 25, Nanji Hangang Park)
2017 MBC Nanjang Damyang Bamboo Festival (May 2, Juknokwon & Jeonnam Provincial University)
2017 Green Plugged Seoul Festival (May 20, Nanji Hangang Park) 
2017 Smile, LOve, Weekend <SLOW> Festival (June 18, Nanji Hangang Park) 
2017 Jisan Valley Rock Festival (July 28, Jisan Forest Resort) 
2017 Jeonju Ultimate Music Festival <JUMF 2017> (August 6, Jeonju Sports Complex) 
2017 Let's Rock Festival – Peace Stage (September 23, Nanji Hangang Park)  
2017 Sang Sang Festival (October 14, KT&G Sangsang Madang, Chuncheon)
2017 Grand Mint Festival (October 22, Olympic Park, Seoul)
2018 Sungkyunkwan University Festival (May 10) 
2018 Youth Festival (May 13, Nanji Hangang Park)
2018 Chung-Ang University Festival (May 14)
2018 Hongik University Festival (May 17)
2018 Green Plugged Seoul Festival (May 20, Nanji Hangang Park) 
2018 Korea University Festival (May 22)
2018 Samda Park Night Concert (May 25, Shin Jeju Rotary)
2018 Midnight Picnic Festival (July 14, Goseong Sampo Beach)
2018 Urban Music Festival (July 21, Sejong University Convention Center)
2018 Green Plugged Donghae Festival (July 22, Mangsang Beach, Donghae)
2018 Jeonju Ultimate Music Festival <JUMF 2018> (August 5, Jeonju Sports Complex)
2018 Incheon Pentaport Rock Festival – KB Kookmin Starshop Stage (August 11, Pentaport Park)
2018 Busan International Rock Festival (August 12, Samnak Ecological Park) 
2018 Melody Forest Camp Festival (September 8, Jarasum)
2018 Let's Rock Festival – Peace Stage (September 15, Nanji Hangang Park) 
2018 Green Plugged Gyeongju Festival (September 16, Hwangseong Park)
2018 Seoul National University Festival (September 18) 
2018 Kookmin University Festival (October 2)  
2018 Korea National University of Education Festival (October 4)
2018 Chung-Ang University Festival (October 5)
2018 Youth Arena (October 6, Incheon Munhak Stadium) 
2018 Chungbuk National University Festival (October 11)
2018 Hankuk University of Foreign Studies Festival (October 12)
2018 Sang Sang Festival (October 13, KT&G Sangsang Madang, Chuncheon) 
2018 Christmas Party- Jeju Wondoshim (Original City) Warangwarang (December 23, Jeju Chilseonglo Outdoor Special Stage)
2018 PRESENT Year-end Concert (December 29–30, KT&G Sangsang Madang, Chuncheon)
 2019 Samda Park Night Concert (April 26, Shin Jeju Rotary) 
 2019 Shinhan DoDream Space Creator Festival (April 28, Shinhan DoDream Space Center, Seoul) 
 2019 Youth Festival (May 11, Nanji Hangang Park)
 2019 Baekseok Culture University Festival (May 15)
 2019 Hongik University Festival (May 16)
 2019 Kyung Hee University Festival (May 17)
 2019 Open The Concert (May 18, Dongtan Multicultural Center) 
 2019 Green Plugged Seoul Festival (May 19, Nanji Hangang Park) 
 2019 Hansei University Festival (May 21) 
 2019 Korea University Festival (May 22) 
 2019 Sungkyunkwan University Natural Sciences Campus Festival (May 23) 
 2019 Kaywon High School of Arts Festival (May 24) 
 2019 Hansoowon Art Festival (HAFESTA 2019) (May 25, Gyeongju Civic Stadium) 
 2019 Rainbow Music & Camping Festival (June 1, Jarasum) 
 2019 DMZ Peace Train Music Festival (June 8, Cheorwon County) 
 2019 Park Concert (June 15, Bundang Central Park)
 2019 Busan International Rock Festival (July 27, Samnak Ecological Park)
 2019 Jeonju Ultimate Music Festival <JUMF 2019> (August 4, Jeonju Sports Complex Stadium)
 2019 The Westin Josun Seoul Summer Art Festival (August 16, The Westin Josun Seoul)
 2019 Korea University of Media Arts Festival TIK-TOK (September 18)
 2019 Seongnam International Medical Tourism Convention (September 20, Seongnam City Hall)  
 2019 Let's Rock Festival – Peace Stage (September 21, Nanji Hangang Park)
 2019 Hanyang University Festival (September 25)
 2019 Korea Polytechnic University Festival (September 26)
 2019 Soongsil University Festival (September 27)
 2019 Green Plugged Gyeongju 2019 (September 28, Gyeongju World Culture Expo Park)
 2019 Kyung Hee University Festival (October 2)
 2019 8th EDAILY WFesta (October 10, Millennium Hilton Seoul)
 2019 Sang Sang Festival (October 12, KT&G Sangsang Madang, Chuncheon)
 2019 Grand Mint Festival (October 19, Olympic Park, Seoul)
 2019 Unicorn Concert (November 1, Yonsei University)
 2019 Someday Theatre Pleroma (November 16–17, COEX Hall D)
 2019 Gyeonggi Broadcasting Corporation 22nd Anniversary Year-end Concert (November 26, Gyeonggi Arts Center)
 2019 8th Seongnam-si Tonggogugma Festival (November 27, Seongnam Arts Center)
 2019 Daegu Music Festival 'Winter Diary' (December 24, Daegu Hotel Susung Convention Hall)
 2019 Yatap High School Festival (December 30, Bundang-gu)
 2019 Seohyun Middle School Festival (December 30, Bundang-gu)
 2022 Beautiful Mint Life Festival (May 13, Olympic Park, Seoul)
 2022 Kyung Hee University Festival (May 24) 
 2022 Korea University Festival (May 25)
 2022 Hanyang University Festival (May 26) 
 2022 Hankuk University of Foreign Studies Festival (May 27) 
 2022 Sangmyung University Festival (May 30) 
 2022 Sang Sang Festival (June 11, KT&G Sangsang Madang, Chuncheon) 
 2022 Immortal Songs Rock Festival in Gangneung (July 18, Gangneung, Korea) 
 2022 Summer for the city: K-Indie Music Night (July 27, Damrosch Park, Lincoln Center) 
 2022 Incheon Pentaport Rock Festival – Pentaport Stage (August 6, Songdo Moonlight Festival Park, Incheon)
 2022 Jecheon International Music & Film Festival – One Summer Night: Mellow Night (August 15, Airfield Stage, Jecheon)
 2022 Someday Festival: Just Music + Unique Festival (September 3, Nanji Hangang Park)
 2022 Chilpo Jazz Festival (September 17, Chilpo Beach, Pohang)
 2022 Joy Olpark Festival (September 24, Olympic Park, Seoul)
 2022 Busan International Rock Festival (October 1, Samnak Ecological Park)
 2022 Gyeonggi Indie Music Festival (October 15, Gyeongin Ara Waterway)

Award shows

Other live performances

References

Jannabi